Lizard Union can refer to:

 Lizard Union (medieval),  an organization of Prussian nobles and knights opposed to the Teutonic Knights
 Military Organization Lizard Union, a far-right Polish resistance organization during World War II